The Arrow Boys are a militia in the Western Equatoria region of South Sudan. The militia sprung up as a self-defense unit who get their name from the bows, arrows supposedly treated with poison, and other traditional weapons they use.

Lord's Resistance Army rebellion
During the insurgency by the Lord's Resistance Army (LRA) in Uganda, the Arrow Boys were started in Teso in the Eastern Region as a self-defense militia. As the Lord's Resistance Army fled Uganda into South Sudan, the militia spread there as well in order to defend against the LRA.

South Sudanese Civil War
When Dinka cattle herders, allegedly backed by the SPLA, occupied farmland, Azande youth rose up into militias mostly with the Arrow Boys, whose leader Alfred Karaba Futiyo Onyang declared allegiance to SPLM-IO and claimed to have occupied parts of Western Equatoria.

See also 
 South Sudan

References

Factions of the South Sudanese Civil War

Rebel groups in South Sudan